For Men Only may refer to:

 For Men Only (magazine), an American men's magazine
 For Men Only (1938 film), an Italian comedy film
 For Men Only (1952 film), an American drama film
 For Men Only (1960 film), a Spanish historical comedy film
 For Men Only (1964 film), an Egyptian romantic comedy film
 For Men Only (1968 film), a British independent film